Logic Masters India (commonly abbreviated as 'LMI') is the Indian representative of the World Puzzle Federation (WPF) which is responsible for conducting national sudoku championships since 2008 to select the Indian team for the world championships. It also aims in organizing various sudoku and puzzle activities in India.

There are three main contest types: Sudoku Mahabharat, Puzzle Ramayan and Daily Puzzle Test.

Sudoku Mahabharat & Puzzle Ramayan 
Each year, the Sudoku Mahabharat (SM) championship consists of 4 online rounds while the Puzzle Ramayan (PR) consists of 6 (approximately one every 2-3 weeks), based on different categories and themes of Sudoku variants (Puzzle types). The online rounds are open to all participants including international solvers.

There are 3-4 spots for the Indian A team for the World Sudoku Championship (WSC) and World Puzzle Championship (WPC), which will be decided during the offline finals of the tournaments.

Each Sudoku Mahabharat round consists of six Standard Sudokus (two 6X6, four 9X9) and six Sudoku Variants (each variant will appear in both sizes, i. e. 6X6 and 9X9).

Each Puzzle Ramayan round consists of three puzzles each in 6 puzzle types within the theme (in double theme rounds, three puzzles each in 3 puzzle types within each theme) and two exploratory variant puzzles in two types within the original theme (in double theme rounds, 2 variant puzzles in one type within each theme).

Participants will get points as allotted for each sudoku correctly submitted. The test uses instant grading where the solver can confirm if the solution is correct immediately after submitting. Each incorrect submission reduces the puzzle's potential score. The first, second, third, and fourth incorrect submissions reduce the potential score to 90%, 70%, 40%, and 0% respectively.

Sudoku Mahabharat 2022

Sudoku Mahabharat 2023

Puzzle Ramayan 2022

Puzzle Ramayan 2023

Daily Puzzle Test 
This contest type is online only and consists of 16 puzzles of the same type. Every puzzle will be live for 30 hours. Cumulative points from each day's solving will determine the final scores.

See also 
Sudoku
Puzzle
World Sudoku Championship
World Puzzle Championship

External links 
Official website

References 

Sudoku
Puzzles
Sudoku competitions
Puzzle competitions